The Ministry of Justice and Legal Affairs is a ministerial department of the government of Antigua and Barbuda. The Minister of Justice simultaneously serves as the Attorney General.

Ministers 
A list of past and current ministers mainly serving after independence in 1981 are listed as follows:

Keith Ford (1979-1995)
 Clare Roberts (1995-1997)
 Radforth Wentworth Hill (1997-1999)
Errol Cort (1999-2001)
Lester Bird (2002-2004)
 Justin Simon (2004-2005)
 Colin Derrick (2006-2009)
 Justin Simon (2010-2014) [referred to as the Attorney General]
Steadroy Benjamin (2014–present)

See also 

 Justice ministry

References

External links 
 https://legalaffairs.gov.ag

External links 

 Official website

Justice ministries
Government of Antigua and Barbuda